The Septuagint (LXX), the ancient (first centuries BC) Alexandrian translation of Jewish scriptures into Koine Greek exists in various manuscript versions.

List of Septuagint manuscripts 

There are currently over 2000 classified manuscripts of the Septuagint.

The first list of Septuagint manuscripts was presented by Holmes and Parsons. Their edition ends with a full list of manuscripts known to them set out in the Annexes. It enumerates 311 codes (marked with Roman numerals I-XIII and Arab 14-311), of which the codes are designated by their siglum I-XIII, 23, 27, 39, 43, 156, 188, 190, 258, 262.

The codes marked with Roman numerals signify given letters from A to Z.

The list of Septuagint manuscripts according to the classification of Alfred Rahlfs - a list of all known Septuagint manuscripts proposed by Alfred Rahlfs based on census of Holmes and Parsons.

Division in classification by Rahlfs 

The table of Septuagint manuscripts is divided into ten parts:

 Part I: A-Z (selected codes in majuscule).
 Part II: 13-311 (numbering given by Holmes and Parsons)
 Part III: 312-800 (manuscripts of the Old Testament, with the exception of the Psalms)
 Part IV: 801-1000 (small fragments of the Old Testament, with the exception of the Psalms)
 Part V: 1001-1400 (psalms from the twelfth century)
 Part VI: 1401-2000 (psalms uncertain dating younger)
 Part VII: 2001-3000 (small fragments psalter [to the eighth century])
 Part VIII: 3001-5000 (manuscripts of the Old Testament, with the exception of the Psalms)
 Part IX: 5001-7000 (small fragments of the Old Testament, with the exception of the Psalms)
 Part X: 7001-xxxx (psalms)

Abbreviations 
 Pent. – Pentateuch (Genesis – Deuteronomy)
 Hept. – Heptateuch (Genesis – Judges)
 Oct. – Octateuch (ἡ ὀκτάτευχος = Genesis – Ruth)
 IV Proph. - Four Major Prophets books.
 XII Proph. - Twelve Minor Prophets books.
 Most book names are not written as full words. They have been abbreviated from their Latin names and can be consulted at the article Books of the Vulgate. Example: Book of Wisdom or, Wisdom of Solomon, is abbreviated as Sap.

Acronyms 
EBE - National Library of Greece

Latin terms 
 aliquot – some
 catenae, catenarum – chain, chains (abbreviated as "cat."). Catena (biblical commentary).
 ecloge – safeguard page
 excerpta – items
 graduales – Songs of Ascents (Ps 119-133 by the numbering in the LXX)
 inter alia – among others
 lacunae - missing words/lines/pages
 poenitentiales – Penitential Psalms
 sine – without

List of manuscripts 
List taken from Manuscripts of the Septuagint, published by Logos.

Part I: A-Z

Part II: 13-311

Part III: 312-800

312-500

501-600

601-700

701-800

Part IV: 801-1000

801-900

901-1000

Part V: 1001-1400

1001-1100

1101-1200

1201-1300

1301-1400

Part VI: 1401-2000

1401-1500

1501-1600

1601-1700

1701-1800

1801-1900

1901-2000

Part VII: 2001-3000

Part VIII: 3001-5000

Part X: 7001-xxxx

See also 
 Biblical manuscripts
 List of the Dead Sea Scrolls
 List of Hebrew Bible manuscripts
 Vulgate manuscripts

References

 
Early versions of the Bible
Hellenism and Christianity
Jewish manuscripts